Malaya Pokrovka is a rural locality (a selo) in Zemlyanskoye Rural Settlement, Semiluksky District, Voronezh Oblast, Russia. The population was 329 as of 2010. There are 2 streets.

Geography 
Malaya Pokrovka is located 55 km northwest of Semiluki (the district's administrative centre) by road. Malaya Vereyka is the nearest rural locality.

References 

Rural localities in Semiluksky District